This is a list of ambushes carried out by the Irish Republican Army against the British armed forces and police.

Irish Republican Army 1918 – 1923

Provisional Irish Republican Army 1969 – 1997

References

Ambushes in Europe
Ambushes
The Troubles (Northern Ireland)-related lists
Irish War of Independence